Kharia may refer to:
Kharia people, ethnic group in the Indian states of Odisha and Jharkhand
Kharia language, Munda language

Language and nationality disambiguation pages